Foxdenton is a semi rural locality in  Chadderton in the Metropolitan Borough of Oldham, Greater Manchester. 
It is located in the west of Chadderton.  Middleton Junction lies to the west with Nimble Nook to the east.

It is the location of the manorial Foxdenton Hall and its grounds, Foxdenton Park.

There were several working farms remaining in Foxdenton until the late 2010s. The commencement of the Broadway Green housing development will, however, see the area become more suburban in character.    The farmhouse at Foxdenton Farm is a grade II listed building.

Early 19th century gazetteers described Foxdenton as a village in the township of Chadderton.

Foxdenton Hall

Foxdenton Hall is a Grade II* listed country house which stands in Foxdenton Park. It is a two storey Georgian house with an English garden wall bond exterior and its own private gardens.

It was built between 1710 and 1730 for Alexander Radclyffe on the base of a previous hall built in 1620 for William Ratclyffe. The hall and the adjoining Park were leased by the Radclyffe family in 1922 to Chadderton Council, who opened the site to the public. In 1960 the council took over ownership of the hall, by which time it was in a state of disrepair, and fully restored it in 1965. From "2003 a group named Friends of Foxdenton started fund raising and ran a café and toilet facility in the hall for the park users but this facility ended when It was, however, declared unsafe in 2011 and was closed by the council. In 2016 the community group Chadderton Together was granted a licensing arrangement allowing it to search for funding to refurbish this building as well as the pavilion behind it. Oldham Council also gave the project a £30,000 grant with the support of ward councillors."

Foxdenton Business Park

A business and housing development on a predominantly greenfield site in and around Foxdenton. Plans, which have now commenced, have been revealed for the creation of up to 450 homes and a business park in the area.  A protest group, Foxdenton and District Protection Group, was set up to oppose the plans.  The plans for the development, given the name 'Broadway Green', were approved by Oldham Council in February 2014. The ongoing development will be completed in an estimated time scale of six to fifteen years.

Transport

First Greater Manchester operates bus service 415 to Lees via Oldham and to Middleton via Alkrington.

References

External links
 Foxdenton Business Park
 http://www.foxdentonllp.co.uk/  Broadway Green website

Areas of Chadderton